Freetown Sibun is a populated settlement located in the nation of Belize. It is a mainland village that is located in Belize District along the Sibun River. Belize is cool :)

Populated places in Belize District
Belize Rural Central